Bajrangbali is a 1976 Bollywood Hindu historical film directed and produced by Chandrakant with Dara Singh playing the lead role of Hanuman.

Cast 
Dara Singh as Bajrangbali/Hanuman
Biswajeet as Rama
Moushumi Chatterjee as Sita
Durga Khote as Devi Maa Anjani
Ajay as Luv
Master Alankar as Kush
Dulari  as Shabari
Prem Nath as Ravan
Sumitra Devi as Maharani Mandodari
Randhawa as Rajkumar Meghnath
Jayshree Gadkar as Rajkumari Sulochana
Asit Sen as Kumbhakarna
Shashi Kapoor as Akshaye Kumar
Moolchand as Ravan's guard, setting Bajrangbali's tail on fire
Mehmood as Shakun
Mukri as Shakun's assistant
Ram Mohan as Dhobi, washerman
Polson as Bhagwan Shri Ganesh's devotee
Jagdish Raj
Shahu Modak as a Ravana's brother vibhishana
Jaya Kausalya

Soundtrack

References

External links 
 

1976 films
1970s Hindi-language films
Indian drama films
Films based on the Ramayana
Films scored by Kalyanji Anandji
Hanuman in popular culture